Saudi El Clasico, also called Saudi Derby, It is called El Clasico proportion to the Spanish football rivalry. is a name of football rivalry for any match between Al-Hilal and Al-Ittihad. It is contested twice a year in the Saudi Premier League competition and often meet in other competitions. Both of them hold two Champions League titles. The rivalry comes about as Riyadh and Jeddah are the two largest cities in Saudi Arabia.

Statistics
There had been 151 official meetings between the two teams. Al-Hilal won 65 times, while Al-Ittihad won 43 times.

Results in the league

Al-Ittihad in the league at home

Al-Hilal in the league at home

Results at Cup matches

King's Cup

(1957-1990)

(2008-Present)

Crown Prince Cup

Federation Cup

Super Cup

Continental

Friendly / Other

Honours
The rivalry reflected in "El Clásico" matches comes about as Al-Ittihad and Al-Hilal are the most successful football clubs in Saudi Arabia. As seen below, Al-Hilal leads the count in official titles won with 64 trophies, while Al-Ittihad has won 34 trophies. Only official trophies are counted.

References

Ittihad FC
Al Hilal SFC
Football rivalries in Saudi Arabia
1960 establishments in Saudi Arabia
Nicknamed sporting events